French v Auckland City Council [1974] 1 NZLR 340 is a cited case in New Zealand regarding land based nuisance claims in tort.

Background
French leased some land in Glendowie. Auckland City owned some of the neighbouring land.

Initially, both parties land were infested with weeds, until French started a weed eradication program, whilst the council did not.

As a result of the weeds on the council land, their seeds continually reinfested French's land.

Eventually, French sued the council for nuisance.

Held
The court awarded French $799.39 in damages for weed eradication.

References

High Court of New Zealand cases
New Zealand tort case law
1974 in New Zealand law
1974 in case law
History of Auckland